The Fortune Code is a 1990 Hong Kong action film directed by Kent Cheng and starring Andy Lau, Sammo Hung, Anita Mui, Alan Tam, Max Mok, Michael Miu, Austin Wai, Eric Tsang, Frankie Chan, and Gordon Liu.

Plot
Set during the Japanese occupation of China, The Fortune Code tells the story of the occupants of a POW camp. When Wah Ying-hung (Andy Lau) manages to escape from the camp to meet up with his sweetheart, he learns that she is a spy.  After being enrolled in the secret service he is sent back into the camp on a secret mission.

His mission is to get the code to a Swiss bank account which will release funds to save China; the only person who knows the code is known as the God of Fortune and is held captive in the camp.

Cast
 Andy Lau as Wah Ying-hung
 Sammo Hung as Brother Hung
 Anita Mui as Jone
 Alan Tam as Robin
 Max Mok as Little Candy
 Michael Miu as Little Robot
 Wilson Lam as Red Horse
 Ben Lam as Little Dragon Fly
 Austin Wai as Little Tortoise
 Eric Tsang as Runaway
 Kent Cheng as Chocolate
 Frankie Chan as White Commander
 Charlie Cho as Peter
 Chung Fat as Japanese Soldier
 Billy Lau as Donald Duck
 Ken Lo as Japanese Soldier
 Eddie Chan as Japanese Soldier 
 Ridley Tsui as Japanese Officer 
 Charine Chan as Nurse
 Jaime Chik as Nurse
 Joan Tong as Nurse
 Sharon Kwok as Nurse 
 Jason Pai as Green Commander
 Kirk Wong as Paul
 Gordon Liu as Blue Commander
 Blackie Ko as Hideki Saijo
 Chen Kuan-tai as Triad boss gambler
 Shing Fui-On as Prisoner
 Natalis Chan as Dragon
 Lung Fong as Japanese Camp Commander Chai
 Stephen Chan as Asst. Camp Commander Kent
 Jassie Lam as Gamble Audience
 Bruce Mang as A Cell's muscle POW

External links
 IMDb listing
 

1990 films
1990 action comedy films
1990 martial arts films
Hong Kong action comedy films
Hong Kong martial arts films
Kung fu films
1990s martial arts comedy films
1990s adventure comedy films
1990s Cantonese-language films
Films set in the 1940s
Films directed by Kent Cheng
Second Sino-Japanese War films
1990s Hong Kong films